All That I Am is the second album by American R&B singer Joe. It was by Jive Records on July 29, 1997, in the United States, marking his debut with the label. Widely considered his breakthrough album, All That I Am reached number thirteen on the US Billboard 200 and number four on the Top R&B/Hip-Hop Albums chart. It was eventually certified Platinum by the Recording Industry Association of America (RIAA).

The album features "All the Things (Your Man Won't Do)", originally featured on the soundtrack of Don't Be a Menace to South Central While Drinking Your Juice in the Hood, which reached number two on the US R&B chart and number eleven on the Billboard Hot 100; it sold 700,000 copies domestically and was certified Gold by the RIAA. The album also features "Don't Wanna Be a Player", which originally appeared on the soundtrack to the 1997 film Booty Call and reached number five on the US R&B chart and number twenty-five on the Hot 100. It, too, earned a Gold certification for sales of 500,000 copies. Aside from these two songs, All That I Am features three singles: the lead single "The Love Scene", "Good Girls" and the title track. Although they received airplay on R&B radio stations, none registered on the Hot R&B Singles chart. Pop group Backstreet Boys covered the song "No One Else Comes Close" on their 1999 album Millennium.

Track listing

Charts

Weekly charts

Year-end charts

Certifications

References

External links
[ All That I Am] at AllMusic

1997 albums
Joe (singer) albums
Jive Records albums